Bambai Ka Babu may refer to:

 Bombai Ka Babu, a 1960 Hindi film
 Bambai Ka Babu (1996 film), a 1996 Bollywood action film